Bellavary, more widely known as Ballyvary, is a village in County Mayo, Ireland. It is situated on the N5 road between Swinford and Castlebar ( north-east of the latter), close to Foxford and the River Moy. At the 2016 Census, Ballyvary had a population of 159. It stands where the River Moy, the railway and the N5 converge. It is a townland in the Parish of Keelogues.

Transport
Ballyvary railway station opened on 19 June 1894, but finally closed on 17 June 1963.

Ballyvary Blue Bombers
Bellavary's soccer team, the Ballyvary Blue Bombers, have been playing in the Mayo League since 1986 and today field teams at underage and junior levels.

Ballyvary Hurling Club
Ballyvary Hurling Club was formed in 2005.

See also
  List of towns and villages in Ireland

References

Towns and villages in County Mayo